Cash cow is business jargon for a commodity that creates a large proportion or the majority of profits for a person or business.

Cash cow may also refer to:

"Cash Cow", a song by We Are Scientists from their album With Love and Squalor
"Cash Cow", a song by Steve Taylor on the album Squint
"Cash Cow", a name used to call  Chinese residents by the  Indonesia government and colonial army in 16th century.
Cashcows, a 2005 series on BBC Radio 4
The "Cash Cow", a character and competition to win money on the Australian morning show Sunrise